Man Mountain may refer to:

Nickname or ring name
 Prime ministers of Great Britain
 William Pitt, 1st Earl of Chatham (1708–1778)
 Professional wrestlers
 Man Mountain Dean (1891–1953), American professional wrestler
 Man Mountain Mike (1940–1988), American professional wrestler
 Man Mountain Harris (born 1948), better known as Black Bart (wrestler)
 Man Mountain Link (born 1959), better known as Rick Link
 Man Mountain Rock (born 1961), better known as Maxx Payne

Arts and entertainment
 Man Mountain Marko, a Marvel Comics supervillain
 "The Man Mountain", a song by Bow Wow Wow
 A character from Better Call Saul